A mediastinal tumor is a tumor in the mediastinum, the cavity that separates the lungs from the rest of the chest. It contains the heart, esophagus, trachea, thymus, and aorta. The most common mediastinal masses are neurogenic tumors (20% of mediastinal tumors), usually found in the posterior mediastinum, followed by thymoma (15–20%) located in the anterior mediastinum. Lung cancer typically spreads to the lymph nodes in the mediastinum.

The mediastinum has three main  parts: the anterior mediastinum (front), the middle mediastinum, and the posterior mediastinum (back). Masses in the anterior portion of the mediastinum can include thymoma, lymphoma, pheochromocytoma, germ cell tumors including teratoma, thyroid tissue, and parathyroid lesions. Masses in this area are more likely to be malignant than those in other compartments.

Masses in the posterior portion of the mediastinum tend to be neurogenic in origin, and in adults tend to be of neural sheath origin including neurilemomas and neurofibromas.

Types

Thymoma

Most common primary anterior mediastinal tumor (20%) in adults but rarely seen in children. It can be classified as lymphocytic, epithelial, or spindle cell histologies, but the clinical significance of these classifications is controversial.  Tonofibrils seen under electron microscopy can differentiate thymoma from other tumors such as carcinoid, Hodgkin's, and seminoma. Patients are usually asymptomatic but can present with myasthenia gravis-related symptoms, substernal pain, dyspnea, or cough. Invasive tumors can produce compression effects such as superior vena cava syndrome. Thymomas are diagnosed with CT or MRI revealing a mass in anterior mediastinum. Therapy in stage I tumors consists of surgical resection with good prognosis. Stage II–III requires maximal resection possible followed by radiation. Stage IV disease requires addition of cisplatin-based chemotherapy in addition to those in stage II and III. For those with invasive thymoma, treatment is based on induction chemotherapy, surgical resection, and post-surgical radiation. 5-year survival for invasive thymoma is between 12 and 54% regardless of any myasthenia gravis symptoms.

Lymphoma

Second most common primary anterior mediastinal mass in adults. Most are seen in the anterior compartment and rest are seen in middle compartment. Hodgkin's lymphoma usually present in 40–50's with nodular sclerosing type (7), and non-Hodgkin's appears in all age groups. There is also primary mediastinal B-cell lymphoma with exceptionally good prognosis.

Common symptoms of a mediastinal lymphoma of include fever, weight loss, night sweats, and compressive symptoms such as pain, dyspnea, wheezing, Superior vena cava syndrome, pleural effusions. Diagnosis usually by CT showing lobulated mass. Confirmation done by tissue biopsy of accompanying nodes if any, mediastinoscopy, mediastinotomy, or thoracotomy. FNA biopsy is usually not adequate. Treatment of mediastinal Hodgkin's involves chemotherapy and/or radiation. 5 year survival is now around 75%. Large-cell type may have somewhat better prognosis. Surgery is generally not performed because of invasive nature of tumor.

Of all cancers involving the same class of blood cell, 2% of cases are mediastinal large B cell lymphomas.

Diagnosis
In several editions of Physical Diagnosis, concerning mediastinal tumors the author writes:

According to Christian1 the mediastinal neoplasms which are neither so rare nor so obscure as to make diagnosis practically impossible are: (1) Sarcoma (including lymphosarcoma, leucaemic growths, and Hodgkins' disease; (2) Teratoma and cyst.

Many signs and symptoms of a mediastinal tumor do not distinguish between these two principal classes of mediastinal tumor.  However, on a radiograph usually the former class will have an irregular shape and the latter class will have a smooth spherical or ovoid shape.  A large minority of patients with a mediastinal teratoma (including dermoid cyst) will cough up hair.  For a differential diagnosis, the key is to exclude aneurism.

See also
 Mediastinal lymphadenopathy

References

External links 

Respiratory system neoplasia
Heart neoplasia